The Vought SBU-1 Corsair was a two-seat, all-metal biplane dive bomber built by Vought Aircraft Company of Dallas, Texas for the US Navy. Its design was based upon the F3U-1 two-seat fighter that was abandoned when the Navy decided not to obtain any more two-seat fighters.

Design and development
The aircraft was equipped with a closed cockpit, had fixed landing gear, and was powered by a Pratt & Whitney R-1535 radial air-cooled engine as had the F3U-1, but also included a controllable pitch propeller and a new NACA cowl with adjustable cowling gills on the trailing edge of the cowl. The adjustable cowling gills permitted better control of cooling airflow over the engine.

The SBU-1 completed flight tests in 1934 and went into production under a contract awarded in January 1935. The Corsair was the first aircraft of its type, a scout bomber, to fly faster than 200 mph. The last SBU Corsairs were retired from active service in 1941, being reassigned as trainers.

The name "Corsair" was used several times by Vought's planes; the O2U/O3U, SBU, F4U, and the A-7 Corsair II.

Operators

Argentine Navy

 United States Navy

Variants
XF3U-1
 Two-seat fighter prototype with a 700 hp R-1535-64 engine.
XSBU-1
 The XF3U-1 converted to scout bomber prototype with a 700 hp R-1535-96 engine, later used as an engine test bed.
SBU-1
 Original production order; 84 aircraft with 750 hp R-1535-82 engine.
SBU-2
 Follow-on order; 40 aircraft with R-1535-98 engines.
Model V.142A
Export version for Argentina.

Specifications (SBU-1)

Notes

Bibliography
  

Swanborough, Gordon and Bowers, Peter M. United States Navy Aircraft since 1911. London:Putnam, 1976. .

External links

SB01U
1930s United States attack aircraft
Single-engined tractor aircraft
Biplanes
Carrier-based aircraft
Aircraft first flown in 1933